That Petrol Emotion were a London-based Northern Ireland-originating band with an American vocalist, Steve Mack. It featured the O'Neill brothers from celebrated Derry pop-punk band The Undertones plus ex-members of fellow Derry bands Bam Bam and The Calling and The Corner Boys. They recorded five albums between 1986 and 1994, exploring an eclectic fusion of alternative rock, post-punk, garage rock and dance music (including sampling) which in part anticipated and overlapped with the dance-pop era of the 1990s.

Following a 14-year break, the band reunited in 2008 for various dates, tours and festival appearances before returning to hiatus in 2010. Four members of the band went on to form The Everlasting Yeah.

Career

Formation and debut single
Following the split of The Undertones, John O'Neill (the band's former guitarist and principal songwriter) returned to his hometown of Derry and teamed up with friend and fellow guitarist Raymond Gorman (ex-Bam Bam And The Calling) to DJ together at Derry's 'Left Bank' club. Inspired by the records they were playing, the two formed first a new songwriting project and then a new band, playing a couple of gigs with a drum machine and Gorman's then-girlfriend as singer. Another friend, drummer Ciaran McLaughlin (formerly with The Corner Boys), but who had also played a few Undertones gigs covering for an absent Billy Doherty) was the next member to join. In autumn 1984, the nascent That Petrol Emotion relocated to London, where the existing three members were joined by John's brother and former Undertones lead guitarist Damian O'Neill (who, desperate to join, agreed to switch to bass guitar). Charismatic Seattle-born American singer Steve Mack (at the time, on a year out from his studies and working in a pizzeria in London) completed the lineup. In 2020, comedian Paul Whitehouse revealed that he had unsuccessfully auditioned for the band during this period.

That Petrol Emotion's influences encompassed artists as diverse as The Beatles, Afrika Bambaataa, Television, Sly & the Family Stone, Captain Beefheart and Can. Following some initial interest from Creation Records, they released their debut single "Keen" on Pink Records in July 1985. The sound of the new band severed overt musical links with The Undertones due to its darker, more edgy sound: That Petrol Emotion were also far more political and outspoken than The Undertones had been, with the Irish members listing their names in their Irish language forms on the sleeve art and (in their songwriting) beginning to look into issues relating to the Irish Troubles. O'Gorman would later describe the band as having been "like the Undertones after discovering drugs, literature and politics, with a lot more girls in the audience dancing." As with The Undertones, John O'Neill emerged as principal songwriter (although songwriting contributions were made by all group members).

Manic Pop Thrill and Babble
Following a busy period gigging in small venues and becoming "ridiculously popular on the pub circuit", plus the release of a second single in September 1985 ("V2", which the band put out on there own temporary Noiseanoise label), That Petrol Emotion signed a deal with Demon Records. Their debut album Manic Pop Thrill, released in 1986, charted at number 1 in the UK Indie Chart. It was received with rave reviews from the critics, especially by Undertones champion John Peel. They were described by Rolling Stone magazine as "The Clash crossed with Creedence", and the New York Times described them in 1987 as "a youthful Rolling Stones" crossed with a "revved-up Television".

The band's second album and major label debut Babble (released in 1987 on Polydor Records) broke into the UK Albums Chart and won universal acclaim, being voted as one of the albums of the year by Rolling Stone magazine critics, and receiving an A− 'grade' from Robert Christgau. In the UK, the single "Big Decision" was released in 1987 which charted at number 42. This would be the band's highest chart position for a single release.

Demonstrating an intensification of the band's political stance, the back sleeve of "Big Decision" had contained text criticising the Diplock Courts in Northern Ireland and their potential ability to convict on false or forced confessions.
Twenty-seven years later, Raymond O'Gorman would comment "with regard to the politics and having grown up with Protestants, my thing was always to go back to civil rights. To make people understand that the only reason the IRA were in existence in the first place was due to the intransigence of the British and the Unionists. The whole situation in Northern Ireland is too difficult to explain and hard for most outsiders to grasp. Once we started talking about politics the music almost became secondary."

The next TPE single of 1987, "Genius Move", was banned from being aired by the BBC due to a reference in the sleeve artwork to Sinn Féin politician Gerry Adams (at the time, a hate figure for the UK establishment due to his suspected links with the IRA, which would lead to his voice being banned from British media between 1988 and 1994). O'Gorman has pointed out "there was no need for any reference to (Adams) 'cos the quote was from Liam Mellows, but I think it had been left to our tour manager to sort out the sleeve and without thinking he included a reference to Adam's book. It will haunt us forever that one. Pretty poor excuse all the same to ban us/the single; pathetic, really; however, no one knew we were banned as they didn't make a fuss a la Frankie Goes To Hollywood, very smart on their part."

By this stage, That Petrol Emotion had won the praise of significant alternative rock figures such as Robert Smith and Robin Guthrie. However, the band's failure to gain further hit singles led to problems with Polydor when the latter's management changed in this period. Following demands made to the band to deliver immediate hit singles, That Petrol Emotion exploited a loophole in their contract and left Polydor, only to be snapped up within a few weeks by Virgin Records.

Lineup shuffle: End of the Millennium Psychosis Blues and Chemicrazy
On the eve of the recording sessions for the third That Petrol Emotion album, End of the Millennium Psychosis Blues, John O'Neill announced his imminent departure from the band. Although he stayed to record the album, the sessions were fraught with tension and foreboding. Gorman has recalled "it was a complete bombshell. When I look back now, we should have thrown him out there and then and got on with the new recording ourselves. Instead we meekly accepted everything and he hung around for another three or four months. It was a toxic situation."

Upon release in 1988, End of the Millennium Psychosis Blues was greeted with confusion by critics and fans alike. It was meant to emulate the eclectic mixtapes the band listened to and loved on their tour bus but this dance and sample experimentation ("Groove Check", "Here It Is... Take It!", "Tension") mixed with heavy alt.rock ("Under the Sky"), Celtic ballads ("Cellophane") and indie ("Sooner or Later", "Every Little Bit") proved too disjointed and diverse to break into the mainstream at the time. However, the album has been reappraised, with many critics and fans admitting that, while this diversity in style did alienate people on the contemporary scene, That Petrol Emotion were very much before their time and were even trailblazers for the Britpop and Madchester indie-dance scene (thanks to their early experiments mixing up indie rock with funk and dance).

Having completed tour dates to promote the album, John O'Neill left That Petrol Emotion in October 1988. Following his departure, a reshuffle took place in the band. Drummer Ciaran McLaughlin and guitarist Raymond Gorman picked up major songwriting duties (blossoming as writers in the process) whilst John Marchini (who had covered on guitar for an ailing Gorman on some of the tour dates) joined on bass guitar to allow Damian O'Neill to take up the guitar alongside Gorman. This new dynamic of musicians and songsmiths led to the 1990 album Chemicrazy, produced by Scott Litt. Working with Litt, the band developed a more alt rock style than before, as hinted at on the final track of the previous album "Under the Sky". Although the album's song were more intense than previous work, Chemicrazy also maintained a pure pop heart, exemplified by singles "Sensitize", "Tingle" and "Hey Venus" (the former track sounding particularly R.E.M-esque). Frustratingly for the band, however, the massive predicted sales for Chemicrazy never happened. The album stalled at UK number 62 and its disappointing performance led to the end of the band's contract with Virgin Records.

Independence: Fireproof and split
After being dropped by Virgin, That Petrol Emotion also parted company with bassist John Marchini (he was replaced by Belfast-born Brendan Kelly) and set up their own record label, Koogat. Kelly's playing pushed That Petrol Emotion towards their heaviest, most riff-laden album to date - Fireproof, released in 1993 - which, like their debut, reached number 1 in the UK Indie Chart. However, despite the generally positive press coverage (and the loyal fan base they had garnered over ten years and five full-length albums), That Petrol Emotion were failing to attain the level of sustained commercial success, or popularity, enjoyed by contemporaries such as My Bloody Valentine and Sonic Youth. As a result, the band split amicably in 1994. A documentary of That Petrol Emotion's farewell concerts in London and Dublin was released posthumously in 2000 as Final Flame (Fire, Detonation And Sublime Chaos).

Following the band's breakup, drummer Ciaran McLaughlin played jazz for a while before switching to guitar and returning to work as a solo singer-songwriter. Singer Steve Mack returned to Seattle, where he would later play bass with Seattle pop-group Cantona and form Anodyne with fellow songwriter Harris Thurmond: an Anodyne album, Tensor, was released in 1998 (using the project name "Marfa Lights" in Europe). Raymond Gorman, Brendan Kelly and Damian O'Neill formed a new band called Wavewalkers in 1996, which played six shows in London, Derry and Paris before splitting up (Gorman would later resurrect the name for a solo project). In 2000, Damian O'Neill released a 12-inch single, "Higher Grace", on the Toy's Factory label (under the name of X-Valdez, featuring arrangements by Xavier Jamaux and vocals by Athena Constantine) and, in 2001, signed to Alan McGee's post Creation label Pop Tones in order to release the experimental electronic album A Quiet Revolution. Former TPE guitarist and songwriting mainstay John O'Neill had already formed the intermittently active Northern Irish trip hop band Rare in 1990, scoring a hit single in 1996 with "Something Wild" and releasing a lone album, Peoplefreak, in 1998.

In November 1999, the O'Neill brothers reunited in a reformed Undertones (with a new lineup minus estranged original frontman Feargal Sharkey) which continues to perform and release records to this day.

Reunion
On 26 March 2008, Steve Mack announced that That Petrol Emotion were reforming (in their Fireproof lineup) to play reunion concerts in the summer. In August 2008 the reunited band played London's The Boston Arms and Dundalk's Spirit Store, then went on to play at the Electric Picnic festival in Stradbally, Ireland.

In March 2009 the band played at the South by Southwest festival in Austin, Texas. In the same month their official site confirmed that That Petrol Emotion would be playing the Hop Farm Festival in Kent, England in July 2009. Shortly afterwards a UK tour also in July 2009 was announced along with stints at Oxegen Festival in Ireland and T In The Park in Scotland. That Petrol Emotion continued their reformation with a spot at the My Bloody Valentine curated Nightmare Before Christmas All Tomorrow's Parties festival in December 2009, followed by dates in the UK and the US.

Hiatus (2010-present) and spinoff band The Everlasting Yeah (2012-present)

Since 2010, That Petrol Emotion have been on an indefinite hiatus, due to Steve Mack choosing to stay in Seattle and concentrate on parental duties. Gorman, McLaughlin, Kelly and Damian O'Neill continued working together (initially with the intention of carrying on with the existing band) but in 2012 announced that they had formed a new band named The Everlasting Yeah playing kosmische/Krautrock-influenced music. The new band's debut gig was in London in support of The June Brides, while their debut album - Anima Rising - was released on their own label Infinite Thrill in 2014. Via crowdfunding, Damian O'Neill recorded the Refit Revise Reprise album with new project The Monotones for release in 2018.

In 2022 Edsel issued a boxed set entitled “Every Beginning Has a Future: An Anthology 1984-1994” of all the band’s albums, the majority of their live tracks/b-sides released while the band was active. An unreleased 1984 live show was included as part of the set.

Legacy

That Petrol Emotion's body of work remains critically acclaimed within the music press. It is widely agreed that, while never achieving chart success, the band left a lasting influence on the Britpop and Madchester movements, specifically on such artists such as The Stone Roses, Happy Mondays, Manic Street Preachers, Andrew Bird, Spoon, Blur and Radiohead. They were posthumously described as having perfected "the art of the scuzzed up alternative pop song" during the 1980s.

Discography

Albums
 Manic Pop Thrill (Demon Records - May 1986) UK No. 84
 Babble (Polydor Records - May 1987) UK No. 30
 End of the Millennium Psychosis Blues (Virgin Records - September 1988) UK No. 53
 Chemicrazy (Virgin Records - April 1990) UK No. 62
 Fireproof (Koogat Records - 1993)
 Final Flame (Fire, Detonation And Sublime Chaos) (live album) (Sanctuary Records - 2000)

Boxed Sets
Every Beginning Has a Future: An Anthology 1984-1994 (Edsel - 2022)

Singles and EPs
 "Keen" (The Pink Label - July 1985)
 "V2" (Noiseanoise - September 1985)
 "It's a Good Thing" (Demon Records - April 1986)
 "Natural Kind of Joy" (Demon Records - August 1986)
 "Big Decision" (Polydor Records - April 1987) UK No. 43
 "Swamp" (Polydor Records - July 1987) UK No. 64
 "Genius Move" (Virgin Records - October 1987) UK No. 65
 "Cellophane" (Virgin Records - September 1988) UK No. 98
 "Groove Check" (Virgin Records - 1989) UK No. 95
 "Abandon" (Virgin Records - March 1990) UK No. 73
 "Hey Venus" (Virgin Records - September 1990) UK No. 49 US Modern Rock No. 9
 "Tingle" (Virgin Records - February 1991) UK No. 49
 "Everybody's Goin' Triple Bad Acid Yeah!"/"Big Decision (Slight Return)" (Clawfist Records - March 1991) (Split single with The Membranes)
 "Sensitize" (Virgin Records - April 1991) UK No. 55
 "Detonate My Dreams" (Koogat Records - 1993)
 Catch a Fire E.P. (Koogat Records - 1993)

Notes

References

External links
 Official site at the Wayback Machine
 That Petrol Emotion at Discogs
 Official fan site

The Undertones
Musical groups from Derry (city)
Musical groups established in 1985
Musical groups disestablished in 1994
Indie rock groups from Northern Ireland
Virgin Records artists
Polydor Records artists
New wave musical groups from Northern Ireland
Musical groups reestablished in 2008
1985 establishments in the United Kingdom